An economic development corporation ("EDC") is an organization common in the United States, usually a 501(c)(3) non-profit, whose mission is to promote economic development within a specific geographical area. These organizations are complementary to Chambers of Commerce. Whereas a Chamber of Commerce promotes the interests of businesses in a particular geographic area, an EDC typically focus on longer-term economic growth by attracting new businesses. Generally, an EDC can be found at the state level to attract business to a particular state. The state level EDC often works closely with local EDCs and may offer low interest loans, grants, tax credits and other economic incentives to attract businesses.

See also
 Development corporation
 Business improvement district
 Pro bono

Further reading
Blanco, Magdelana. 2009. Preliminary Assessment of Statutory Compliance of 4A and 4B Economic Development Corporations in Texas with the Development Corporation Act of 1979. Applied Research Project. Texas State University.  http://ecommons.txstate.edu/arp/300/

Economic development organizations in the United States